Impostor syndrome, also known as impostor phenomenon or impostorism, is a psychological occurrence in which people doubt their skills, talents, or accomplishments and have a persistent internalized fear of being exposed as frauds. Despite external evidence of their competence, those experiencing this phenomenon do not believe they deserve their success or luck. They may incorrectly attribute it to the Matthew effect, or they may think that they are deceiving others because they feel as if they are not as intelligent as they outwardly portray themselves to be. Impostor syndrome can stem from and result in strained personal relationships and can hinder individuals from achieving their full potential in their fields of interest.

When impostor syndrome was first conceptualized, it was viewed as a phenomenon that was common among high-achieving women. Further research has shown that it affects both men and women, in the collective sense that the proportion affected are more or less equally distributed among the genders. Individuals with impostor syndrome often have corresponding mental health issues, which may be treated with psychological interventions, though the phenomenon is not a formal mental disorder.

History 
The term impostor phenomenon was introduced in an article published in 1978, titled "The Impostor Phenomenon in High Achieving Women: Dynamics and Therapeutic Intervention" by Pauline R. Clance and Suzanne A. Imes. Clance and Imes defined impostor phenomenon as "an internal experience of intellectual phoniness" and initially focused their research on women in higher education and professional industries.

The researchers surveyed over 100 women, approximately one-third of whom were involved in psychotherapy for reasons besides impostor syndrome and two-thirds of whom they knew from their own lectures and therapy groups. All of the participants had been formally recognized for their professional excellence by colleagues and displayed academic achievement through educational degrees and standardized testing scores. Despite the consistent external validation these women received, they lacked internal acknowledgement of their accomplishments. When asked about their success, some participants attributed it to luck, while some believed that people had overestimated their capabilities. Clance and Imes believed that this mental framework of impostor phenomenon developed from factors such as gender stereotypes, familial problems, cultural norms, and attribution style. They discovered that the women in the study experienced symptoms of "generalized anxiety, lack of self-confidence, depression, and frustration related to inability to meet self-imposed standards of achievement."

Psychopathology 
Certain individuals with impostor syndrome may see themselves as less ill (less depressed, less anxious) than their peers or other mentally ill people, citing their lack of severe symptoms as the indication of the absence of or a minor underlying issue. People with this mindset often do not seek help for their issues because they see their problems as not worthy of psychiatric attention.

Impostor phenomenon is studied as a reaction to particular stimuli and events. It is an experience that occurs in an individual, not a mental disorder. Impostor phenomenon is not recognized in the DSM or ICD, although both of these classification systems recognize low self-esteem and sense of failure as associated symptoms of depression.

Measuring impostor phenomenon 

The first scale designated to measure characteristics of impostor phenomenon was designed by Clance in 1985, called the Clance Impostor Phenomenon Scale (CIPS). The scale can be used to determine if characteristics of fear are present in the individual, and to what extent. The aspects of fear include: "fear of evaluation, fear of not continuing success and fear of not being as capable as others." Characteristics of impostor syndrome such as an individual's self-esteem and their perspective of how they achieve success are measured by the CIPS. A sample of 1271 engineering college students were studied by Brian F. French, Sarah C. Ullrich-French, and Deborah Follman to examine the psychometric properties of the CIPS. They found that scores of the scales' individual components were not entirely reliable or consistent and suggested that these should not be used to make significant decisions about individuals with the syndrome.

In her 1985 paper, Clance explained that impostor phenomenon can be distinguished by the following six characteristics, of which an individual who has impostorism must experience at least two:

 The impostor cycle
 The need to be special or the best
 Characteristics of superman/superwoman
 Fear of failure
 Denial of ability and discounting praise
 Feeling fear and guilt about success

Occurrence 
It has been estimated that nearly 70% of individuals will experience signs and symptoms of impostor phenomenon at least once in their life.  Research shows that impostor phenomenon is not uncommon for students who enter a new academic environment. Feelings of insecurity can come as a result of an unknown, new environment. This can lead to lower self-confidence and belief in their own abilities.

Gender differences 
Clance and Imes stated in their 1978 article that, based on their clinical experience, impostor phenomenon was less prevalent in men. However, more recent research has mostly found that impostor phenomenon is spread equally among men and women. Research has shown that women commonly face impostor phenomenon in regard to performance. The perception of ability and power is evidenced in out-performing others. For men, impostor phenomenon is often driven by the fear of being unsuccessful, or not good enough.

Settings 
Impostor phenomenon can occur in other various settings. Some examples include a new environment, academic settings, in the workplace, social interactions, and relationships (platonic or romantic).

In relationships, people with impostorism often feel they do not live up to the expectations of their friends or loved ones. It is common for the individual with impostorism to think that they must have somehow tricked others into liking them and wanting to spend time with them. They experience feelings of being unworthy, or of not deserving the beneficial relationships they possess.

There is empirical evidence that demonstrates the harmful effects of impostor phenomenon in students. Studies have shown that when a student's academic self-concept increases, the symptoms of impostor phenomenon decrease, and vice versa. The worry and emotions the students held, had a direct impact of their performance in the program. Common facets of impostor phenomenon experienced by students include not feeling prepared academically (especially when comparing themselves to classmates), questioning the grounds on which they were accepted into the program, and perceiving that positive recognition, awards, and good grades stemmed from external factors rather than personal ability or intelligence.

Cokley et al. investigated the impact impostor phenomenon has on students, specifically ethnic minority students. They found that the feelings the students had of being fraudulent resulted in psychological distress. Ethnic minority students often questioned the grounds on which they were accepted into the program. They held the false assumption that they only received their acceptance due to affirmative action—rather than an extraordinary application and qualities they had to offer.

Tigranyan et al. (2021) examined the way impostor phenomenon relates to psychology doctoral students. The purpose of the study was to investigate the IP's relationship to perfectionistic cognitions, depression, anxiety, achievement motives, self-efficacy, self-compassion, and self-esteem in clinical and counseling psychology doctoral students. Furthermore, this study sought to investigate how IP interferes with academic, practicum, and internship performance of these students and how IP manifests throughout a psychology doctoral program. Included were 84 clinical and counseling psychology doctoral students and they were instructed to respond to an online survey. The data was analyzed using a Pearson's product-moment correlation and a multiple linear regression. Eighty-eight percent of the students in the study reported at least moderate feelings of IP characteristics. This study also found significant positive correlations between the IP and perfectionistic cognitions, depression, anxiety, and self-compassion. This study indicates that clinical faculty and supervisors should take a supportive approach to assist students to help decrease feelings of IP, in hopes of increasing feelings of competence and confidence.

Connections 
Research has shown that there is a relationship between impostor phenomenon and the following factors:

 Family expectations
 Overprotective parent(s) or legal guardian(s)
 Graduate-level coursework
 Racial identities
 Attribution style
 Anxiety
 Depression
 Low trait self-esteem
 Perfectionism
 Excessive self-monitoring, with an emphasis on self-worth

The aspects listed are not mutually exclusive. These components are often found to correlate among individuals with impostor phenomenon. It is incorrect to infer that the correlational relationship between these aspects cause the impostor experience.

In individuals with impostor phenomenon, feelings of guilt often result in a fear of success. The following are examples of common notions that lead to feelings of guilt and reinforce the phenomenon.

 The good education they were able to receive
 Being acknowledged by others for success
 Belief that it is not right or fair to be in a better situation than a friend or loved one
 Being referred to as:
 "The smart one"
 "The talented one"
 "The responsible one"
 "The sensitive one"
 "The good one"
 "Our favorite"

Management 
In their 1978 paper, Clance and Imes proposed a therapeutic approach they used for their participants or clients with impostor phenomenon. This technique includes a group setting where various individuals meet others who are also living with this experience. The researchers explained that group meetings made a significant impact on their participants. They proposed that this impact was a result of the realization that they were not the only ones who experienced these feelings. The participants were required to complete various homework assignments as well. In one assignment, participants recalled all of the people they believed they had fooled or tricked in the past. In another take-home task, individuals wrote down the positive feedback they had received. Later, they would have to recall why they received this feedback and what about it made them perceive it in a negative light. In the group sessions, the researchers also had the participants re-frame common thoughts and ideas about performance. An example would be to change: "I might fail this exam" to "I will do well on this exam".

The researchers concluded that simply extracting the self-doubt before an event occurs helps eliminate feelings of impostorism. It was recommended that the individuals struggling with this experience seek support from friends and family. Although impostor phenomenon is not a pathological  condition, it is a distorted system of belief about oneself that can have a powerful negative impact on an individual's valuation of their own worth. Impostor syndrome is not a recognized psychiatric disorder: It is not featured in the American Psychiatric Association's Diagnostic and Statistical Manual nor is it listed as a diagnosis in the International Classification of Diseases, Tenth Revision (ICD-10). Outside the academic literature, impostor syndrome has become widely discussed, especially in the context of achievement in the workplace. Perhaps because it is not an officially recognized clinical diagnosis, despite the large peer review and lay literature, although there has been a qualitative review, there has never been a published systematic review of the literature on impostor syndrome. Thus, clinicians lack evidence on the prevalence, comorbidities, and best practices for diagnosing and treating impostor syndrome.

Other research on therapeutic approaches for impostorism emphasizes the importance of self-worth. Individuals who live with impostor phenomenon commonly relate self-esteem and self-worth to others. A major aspect of other therapeutic approaches for impostor phenomenon focus on separating the two into completely separate entities.

In a study in 2013, researcher Queena Hoang proposed that intrinsic motivation can decrease the feelings of being a fraud that are common in impostor phenomenon. Hoang also suggested that implementing a mentor program for new or entering students will minimize students' feelings of self-doubt. Having a mentor who has been in the program will help the new students feel supported. This allows for a much smoother and less overwhelming transition.

Impostor experience can be addressed with many kinds of psychotherapy. Group psychotherapy is an especially common and effective way of alleviating the impostor experience.

Individuals 

Below is a small selection of notable individuals who have reportedly experienced this phenomenon:

 Riz Ahmed
 Maya Angelou
 Jacinda Ardern
 Mike Cannon-Brookes
 Tommy Cooper
 Barbara Corcoran
 Neil Gaiman
 Tom Hanks
 Chuck Lorre
 Michelle Obama
 Michelle Pfeiffer
 Sonia Sotomayor
 Nicola Sturgeon
David Tennant
 Emma Watson
 Matty Healy
 Thom Yorke
Lando Norris
André 3000

See also 

 Capgras delusion a psychiatric disorder which manifests as the irrational belief that one’s loved ones, close friends or associates have been replaced with identical doppelgängers
 Cotard’s syndrome a rare psychological disorder in which the sufferer believes themselves to be dead
 Dunning–Kruger effect a cognitive bias wherein people of non-average ability (both high and low) inaccurately estimate their own abilities
 Explanatory style how people typically explain events to themselves
 Illusory superiority a cognitive bias whereby people overestimate their own qualities and abilities
 Inner critic a manifestation of the inner voice which demeans and criticises the person it belongs to
 "Fakin' It" (Simon & Garfunkel song) 1960s-era pop/rock song on the subject
 Jonah complex the fear of success which prevents the realisation of one's potential
 Library anxiety
 Mindset
 Poseur
 Self-handicapping
  a psychological phenomenon where someone intentionally attempts to prevent their own success at a given task
 Tall poppy syndrome aspects of a culture where people of high status are resented for having been viewed as superior to their peers
 Inferiority complex

References

External links 

1978 introductions
Popular psychology
1970s neologisms
Cognitive biases